Daryl Griffiths (born 6 November 1945) is a former Australian rules footballer in the VFL.
Height: 183 cm, Weight: 82.5 kg.

Goaled with his first kick in VFL football playing as full forward, but was flattened by Essendon's "Bluey" Shelton and left the ground with a broken collarbone in the same match.

Griffiths played with St Kilda in several positions including as ruck-rover in the 1966 premiership win.

Club best and fairest winner in 1970 in a talented side.
Later played for Claremont in the WAFL.

References 
 
 Saints honour roll
 Profile from AustralianFootball.com
 Boyles Football Photos: Daryl Griffiths

External links
 

Trevor Barker Award winners
1945 births
Living people
St Kilda Football Club players
St Kilda Football Club Premiership players
Claremont Football Club players
Terang Football Club players
Australian rules footballers from Victoria (Australia)
One-time VFL/AFL Premiership players